The City may refer to:

Places
"The City", a term for a city centre
"The City", a term used for New York City
"The City", a term for Manhattan, New York City
"The City", a term for the City of Chicago, particularly as distinct from the various suburban municipalities and communities surrounding it, making-up the rest of the "Chicagoland" metropolitan region and outlying hinterlands
"The City", a term for Boston, Massachusetts
"The City", a term for the City of London, the historic core of London, England; also used to refer to the British financial services sector
"The City", a term for San Francisco, California
The City, Buckinghamshire, England
The City Shopping Center, a former name of The Outlets at Orange in Orange, California

Fictional cities
 The City (The Tick), the fictional setting of The Tick comic books and TV series
 The City (Transmetropolitan), a fictional megacity in the Vertigo comic Transmetropolitan
 "The City", the setting of the Thief video game series

Books and websites
 The City (website), a New York City based non-profit, digital news site founded in 2018
The City (Park and Burgess book), a 1925 book by Robert E. Park and Ernest W. Burgess
The City (Pidmohylny novel), a 1928 novel by Valerian Pidmohylny
"The City" (poem), an 1894 poem by Constantine P. Cavafy
"The City" (short story), a 1951 short story by Ray Bradbury
The City (Weber book), a 1921 book by Max Weber
 The City (wordless novel), a 1925 wordless novel by Frans Masereel
The City, a 1909 play by Clyde Fitch
The City, a 1990–2014 comic strip by Derf Backderf
The City, a 1993 graphic novel by James Herbert
The City (magazine), an American magazine of evangelical Christianity

Film, television

Film
The City (1916 film), a 1916 film
The City (1926 film), a lost 1926 silent film
The City (1939 film), an American documentary by Steiner and Van Dyke
The City (1977 film), a pilot for an unproduced American crime drama TV series
The City (1994 film), a Malayalam action film
The City (1998 film), an American neo-realist film by David Riker

Television
The City (1995 TV series), an American soap opera, 1995–1997
The City (1999 TV series), a Canadian prime time soap opera
The City (2008 TV series), an American reality television series, 2008–2010

Music
The City (band), a 1980s alternative rock band 
The City (group), a music trio composed of Carole King, Danny Kortchmar, and Charles Larkey
The City (XM), an Urban Top 40 radio channel
"The City", the setting of Greenday's 2004 concept album American Idiot

Albums
The City (Vangelis album), 1990
The City (FemBots album), 2005
The City (EP), a 2012 EP by Madeon, or its title song

Songs
"The City" (song), a 2012 song by The 1975
"The City", a 1999 song by The Dismemberment Plan from Emergency & I
"The City", a 2011 song by Ed Sheeran from +
"The City", a 2011 song by Game from The R.E.D. Album
"The City", a 2011 song by The Haunted from Unseen
"The City", a 2011 song by Patrick Wolf from Lupercalia

Visual arts
The City (Léger), a 1919 painting

See also

City (disambiguation)